The 2015 Toyota Racing Series was the eleventh running of the Toyota Racing Series, the premier open-wheeler motorsport category held in New Zealand. The series, which consisted of sixteen races at five meetings, began on 14 January at Ruapuna Park in Christchurch, and ended on 15 February with the 60th running of the New Zealand Grand Prix, at Manfeild Autocourse in Feilding.

With a third-place finish in the penultimate race of the season at Manfeild, Canadian driver Lance Stroll – driving for M2 Competition – clinched the championship title, having amassed an unassailable 93-point lead ahead of the final race. Stroll won three of the first four races to be held in the series at Ruapuna and Teretonga (taking the round wins at both circuits) before consistent finishing for the remainder of the campaign allowed him to maintain his championship lead throughout. Stroll added his fourth win of the season in the final race, the New Zealand Grand Prix, becoming the first Canadian to win the Grand Prix. M2 Competition team-mate Brandon Maïsano finished the season as runner-up, 108 points in arrears of Stroll. Maïsano won five races during the season – the most of all drivers – with a win at each meeting except for Teretonga, while taking the round win at Hampton Downs.

Third place in the championship went to Santino Ferrucci, for the Giles Motorsport team. Ferrucci took five podium finishes before taking his first victory at Manfeild, in the second race. He finished 33 points behind Maïsano and 141 behind Stroll. Four other drivers took race victories during the 2015 season as Arjun Maini (M2 Competition) and Sam MacLeod (Giles Motorsport) each won two races – both at Hampton Downs and Taupo respectively – as they completed the top five in the drivers' championship, with MacLeod taking the round wins at Taupo and Manfeild. Two drivers from New Zealand also won races, both coming at Teretonga Park as Jamie Conroy – another M2 Competition driver – and Brendon Leitch, for Victory Motor Racing, both achieved their first victories in the series. Only ETEC Motorsport failed to take a race win, with a pair of third places from Thomas Randle being their best result.

Teams and drivers
All teams were New-Zealand registered.

Race calendar and results
The calendar for the series was announced on 14 July 2014, and was held over five successive weekends in January and February. The event at Taupo Motorsport Park was held as a quadruple-header, the first such instance for the series.

Championship standings
In order for a driver to score championship points, they had to complete at least 75% of the race winner's distance, and be running at the race's completion. All races counted towards the final championship standings.

Scoring system

Drivers' championship

References

External links
 

Toyota Racing Series
Toyota Racing Series